Hiram Robert Fowler (February 7, 1851 – January 5, 1926) was a U.S. Representative from Illinois.

Early life and education
Born near Eddyville, Illinois, Fowler attended the public schools of his native city, and graduated from the Illinois Normal University at Normal in 1880. He studied law at the University of Michigan at Ann Arbor and graduated in 1884. He was admitted to the bar in 1884 and commenced the practice of his profession in Elizabethtown, Illinois.

Career in politics
Fowler served as State's Attorney of Hardin County from 1888 to 1892. He also served in the state house of representatives from 1893 to 1895, and he later served as a member of the state senate from 1900 to 1904. Fowler was elected as a Democrat to the Sixty-second and Sixty-third Congresses (March 4, 1911 – March 3, 1915). However, he was an unsuccessful candidate for reelection in 1914.

Later life
After his unsuccessful campaign in 1914, Fowler resumed the practice of law in Elizabethtown, Illinois. He moved to Harrisburg, Illinois in 1915 and continued practice until his death on January 5, 1926. He was interred in Sunset Hill Cemetery.

References

1851 births
1926 deaths
Illinois State University alumni
People from Pope County, Illinois
University of Michigan Law School alumni
Democratic Party members of the United States House of Representatives from Illinois
Democratic Party members of the Illinois House of Representatives
Democratic Party Illinois state senators
People from Elizabethtown, Illinois
People from Harrisburg, Illinois